Saturnian or Saturnial may refer to:
Something of or relating to:
Saturn, sixth planet from the Sun
Saturn (mythology), a Roman agricultural deity
Saturnian (poetry), the form of poetry which uses Saturnian Verse
Saturnian (album), an album by saxophonist David S. Ware
Saturnian (band), Extreme Symphonic Metal band from the UK